The Perelman School of Medicine (commonly known as Penn Med) is the medical school of the University of Pennsylvania, a private research university in Philadelphia, Pennsylvania. Founded in 1765, the Perelman School of Medicine is the oldest medical school in the United States and is one of the seven Ivy League medical schools.

History
 

The school of medicine was founded by John Morgan, a graduate of the College of Philadelphia (the precursor of the University of Pennsylvania) and the University of Edinburgh Medical School. After training in Edinburgh and other European cities, Morgan returned to Philadelphia in 1765. With fellow University of Edinburgh Medical School graduate William Shippen Jr., Morgan persuaded the college's trustees to found the first medical school in the Original Thirteen Colonies. Only months before the medical school was created, Morgan delivered an address to the trustees and the citizens of Philadelphia, "Upon the Institution of Medical Schools in America" during which he expressed his desire for the new medical school to become a model institution:

That autumn, students enrolled for "anatomical lectures" and a course on "the theory and practice of physick." Modeling the school after the University of Edinburgh Medical School, medical lectures were supplemented with bedside teaching at the Pennsylvania Hospital.

The School of Medicine's early faculty included nationally prominent physicians and scientists such as Benjamin Rush, Philip Syng Physick, and Robert Hare. Benjamin Rush, in addition to being a Penn professor of chemistry, medical theory, and clinical practice, was also a signer of the United States Declaration of Independence and member of the Continental Congress.

In the mid-1800s, notable faculty members included William Pepper, Joseph Leidy, and Nathaniel Chapman (founding president of the American Medical Association). William Osler and Howard Atwood Kelly, two of the "founding four" physicians of Johns Hopkins Hospital were drawn from Penn's medical faculty. Later, in 1910, the landmark Flexner Report on medical education reviewed Penn as one of the relatively few medical schools of the era with high standards in admission criteria, medical instruction, and research facilities.

Name
In 2011, the University of Pennsylvania School of Medicine was renamed to the Perelman School of Medicine at the University of Pennsylvania in recognition of a $225 million gift by Raymond and Ruth Perelman. Raymond and his son, Ronald Perelman, are both alumni of Penn's Wharton School. It was the single largest gift made in the university's history, and it remains the largest donation ever made for naming rights to a medical school.

Campus and teaching hospitals

Between 1765 and 1801, medical school lectures were held in Surgeon's Hall on 5th Street in Center City, Philadelphia. In 1801, medical instruction moved with the rest of the university to 9th Street. In the 1870s, the university moved across the Schuylkill River to a location in West Philadelphia. As part of this move, the medical faculty persuaded the university trustees to construct a teaching hospital adjacent to the new academic facilities. As a result, Penn's medical school and flagship teaching hospital form part of the university's main campus and are located in close proximity to the university's other schools and departments. Although they are independent institutions, the Children's Hospital of Philadelphia and the Wistar Institute are also located on or adjacent to Penn's campus.

The Hospital of the University of Pennsylvania, Penn Presbyterian Medical Center, Pennsylvania Hospital, and the Children's Hospital of Philadelphia serve as the medical school's main teaching hospitals. Additional teaching takes place at Chester County Hospital, Lancaster General Hospital, and the Philadelphia VA Medical Center.

Medical advancements

During the late nineteenth and early twentieth centuries, the School of Medicine was one of the earliest to encourage the development of the emerging medical specialties: neurosurgery, ophthalmology, dermatology, and radiology.  Between 1910 and 1939, the chairman of the Department of Pharmacology, Alfred Newton Richards, played a significant role in developing the university as an authority of medical science, helping the United States to catch up with European medicine and begin to make significant advances in biomedical science.

In the 1950s and early 1960s, Jonathan Rhoads of the Department of Surgery (which he would later go on to head for many years) mentored Stanley Dudrick who pioneered the successful use of total parenteral nutrition (TPN) for patients unable to tolerate nutrition through their GI tract.

In the 1980s and 1990s, C. William Schwab, a trauma surgeon, led numerous advances in the concept of damage control surgery for severely injured trauma patients.

In the 1990s and 2000s, Paul Offit, a professor of pediatrics at the School of Medicine and Children's Hospital of Philadelphia, lead the scientific advances behind the modern RotaTeq vaccine for infectious childhood diarrhea.

In 2006, Drs. Kaplan and Shore of the Department of Orthopedics discovered the causative mutation in fibrodysplasia ossificans progressiva, an extremely rare disease of bone.

Medical curriculum
Benchmark changes in the understanding of medical science and the practice of medicine have necessitated that the school change its methods of teaching, as well as its curriculum. Large changes were made in 1968, 1970, 1981, 1987, and 1997. The last significant change in 2022 brought about the institution of the IMPaCT curriculum, "an integrated, multidisciplinary curriculum which emphasizes small group instruction, self-directed learning and flexibility." Three themes, Science of Medicine, Technology and Practice of Medicine, and Professionalism and Humanism, were developed by focus groups consisting of department chairpersons, course directors, and students.

Biomedical Graduate Studies
Biomedical Graduate Studies, contained within the Perelman School of Medicine, was established in 1985 and serves as the academic home within the University of Pennsylvania for roughly 700 students pursuing a PhD in the basic biomedical sciences. BGS consists of more than 600 faculty members across seven Penn schools and several associated institutes including Wistar Institute, Fox Chase Cancer Center, and Children's Hospital of Philadelphia. There are seven graduate programs, labeled by the school as "graduate groups," that lead to a Ph.D. in basic biomedical sciences. 
 Biochemistry and Molecular Biophysics
 Cell and Molecular Biology
 Epidemiology and Biostatistics
 Genomics and Computational Biology
 Immunology
 Neuroscience
 Pharmacology

All biomedical graduate studies students receive a stipend in addition to a full fellowship and tend to receive the degree within a median time frame of 5.4 years. There is also the option for students to pursue an additional certificate in medicine, public health, and environmental health sciences. Each graduate group has its own admission policy and training mission, and hence curriculum greatly varies.

Governance
The Perelman School of Medicine and the University of Pennsylvania Health System (UPHS) comprise "Penn Medicine". Penn Medicine is an organizational structure designed to integrate Penn's clinical, educational, and research functions. Penn Medicine is governed by a board of trustees which in turn reports to the trustees of the university. Kevin B. Mahoney serves as CEO of UPHS while J. Larry Jameson serves as Dean of Medicine and Executive Vice President of the health system.

Departments
The School of Medicine has departments in the following basic science subjects: Biochemistry and Biophysics, Biostatistics and Epidemiology, Cancer Biology, Cell and Developmental Biology, Genetics, Medical Ethics and Health Policy, Microbiology, Neuroscience, Pharmacology, and Physiology. The school also has departments in the following clinical practices: Anesthesiology and Critical Care, Dermatology, Emergency Medicine, Family Practice and Community Medicine, Medicine, Neurology, Neurosurgery, Obstetrics and Gynecology, Ophthalmology (See Scheie Eye Institute), Orthopaedic Surgery, Otorhinolaryngology, Pathology and Laboratory Medicine, Pediatrics (See Children's Hospital of Philadelphia), Physical Medicine and Rehabilitation, Psychiatry, Radiation Oncology, Radiology, and Surgery.

Centers and institutes 

The Perelman School of Medicine, in conjunction with the University of Pennsylvania Health System, has contained within it many centers and institutes dealing with clinical medicine, clinical research, basic science research, and translational research.

Notable alumni

Among the noteworthy alumni referenced in Wikipedia entry accessible via above link are four graduates who were awarded the Nobel Prize, two alumni who were awarded the Medal of Honor, and hundreds of alumni (in chronological order starting from very first 18th century  graduating class) who contributed to the health and well-being of Earth.

See also
Guatemala Health Initiative, a University of Pennsylvania-affiliated private aid organization; partners with the Perelman School of Medicine in its program delivery
Medical schools in Pennsylvania
List of Ivy League medical schools
University of Pennsylvania Health System
University of Edinburgh Medical School

References

External links

 Official website

 
Pennsylvania, University of
1765 establishments in Pennsylvania
Medicine, Perelman School of
Ivy League medical schools